The Channel Seven Perth Telethon, regionally known simply as Telethon, is an annual telethon established in 1968 by philanthropist Sir James Cruthers and Brian Treasure, and produced by TVW, a Seven Network-owned television station in Perth, Western Australia. It raises money for over 50 beneficiaries each year including the Perth Children's Hospital, the Telethon Clinical Research Centre and the Telethon Kids Institute. Channel Seven's Perth Telethon is the highest donating telethon (per capita) in the world, and since the first Telethon in 1968 has raised over A$500 million in total.

The Channel 7 Telethon Trust is the charitable trust behind the event and its related fundraising activities. The philosophy behind the Channel 7 Telethon Trust is to financially support the medical and social welfare of children and young people and to fund research into children's diseases.

Overview

The Telethon broadcast usually runs around 26 hours non-stop, starting from 7.00pm on a Saturday night in October, broadcasting live across Western Australia on the Seven Network throughout the metropolitan area of Perth and across the rest of Western Australia; the broadcast was also carried by Seven-affiliate GWN7 in regional Western Australia before the network's dissolution in 2022. As of 2022 Telethon is held at Perth Arena; the event was originally held at TVW's former studios at Dianella, from 2005 to 2019 it was held at the Perth Convention & Exhibition Centre, and in 2020 and 2021 the opening and closing portions of the broadcast were held at the Crown Theatre at Crown Perth. The event aims to raise money for its beneficiaries from donations from private citizens, organisations, businesses and corporations, as well as from special fundraising events held throughout the year and the public auction of up to two specially built Telethon homes, with one in the metropolitan area of Perth and one in a regional area of Western Australia.

Since its inception in 1968, one or more children currently undergoing treatment at Perth Children's Hospital (and before 2018, Princess Margaret Hospital for Children) are chosen by Telethon to represent all the children who benefit from the money raised during that year's event. Although one child has been traditionally chosen to be that year's representative, since 2008 two children, one from the metropolitan area and one from a regional area, have been chosen each year, and on occasion more than two children have been featured on Telethon. Since 2010 these children have been referred to as the "Little Telethon Stars", and their stories are highlighted in the lead up to and during the event. The first "Little Telethon Star" was Maryanne Lazerides, who was the youngest person to have open heart surgery at just 11 months old. Two former "Little Telethon Stars", Louise Sauvage and Ben Popham, have gone on to become gold medal winning Paralympians.

Talent from Seven Network shows such as Home & Away and Sunrise make the journey to the west coast of Australia for the weekend to entertain the audience, visit unwell children at Perth Children's Hospital, take phone calls, and generally participate in the 26-hour marathon broadcast. In addition, Telethon has hosted a number of high profile international guests including Michael Jackson, Phyllis Diller, Carrie Fisher, and the Harlem Globetrotters. A number of Australian guests, such as Hugh Jackman, Chris Hemsworth, Samara Weaving, Ryan Kwanten and Troye Sivan, have also appeared on Telethon before achieving international fame themselves. Musical guests are also an integral part of the weekend's entertainment; over the years, notable international performers during Telethon have included Sir Cliff Richard, Harry Connick Jr., Whitney Houston, Stevie Wonder, Tina Turner, Julian Lennon, Sammy Davis Jr. and Céline Dion. In more recent years, finalists from talent shows such as Australian Idol, The X Factor, The Voice and Australia's Got Talent have also made appearances during the event, joining lower profile and local acts.

Costumed character Fat Cat from the former children's television show Fat Cat and Friends serves as the mascot for Telethon. Basil Zempilas has been the anchoring host of the broadcast since 2010. He took over the role from longtime TVW7 weather presenter Jeff Newman, who had hosted the event for 32 years before retiring in 2009. 

A number of figures related to Telethon have been honoured with the Medal of the Order of Australia. In 1994 Jeff Newman was awarded for services to charity and fundraising through his work with Telethon and the Variety Club of Western Australia. In 2019 Glenn Christie was awarded for his service to the community through support for charitable initiatives, including 3 decades of volunteering to Telethon. Former "Little Telethon Star" Ben Popham was awarded the Medal of the Order of Australia for his services to sport in 2022.

History

TVW previously broadcast one-off telethons for bushfire relief in 1961, and to raise funds for Christmas care packages sent to Western Australian soldiers serving in Vietnam in 1966 and 1967.

Telethon began in 1968 when the Telethon Trust was established by senior executives Sir James Cruthers and Brian Treasure at Channel 7 Perth. It was inspired by the success of the first MDA Labor Day Telethon hosted by Jerry Lewis in the United States in 1966, and the Good Friday Appeal in Melbourne. Cruthers first brought up the idea with then-CEO of Princess Margaret Hospital, James Clarkson during a round of golf at Lake Karrinyup Country Club, who suggested that the focus should be on facilitating medical research. 

Although all of the station staff agreed to volunteer their time to host the event, the first Perth Telethon has been described as chaotic: the station was open to the public for the first time resulting in hours-long queues of people wanting to get in, there were no computers so pledges and receipts were written out by hand, and anyone who pledged more than $2000 ($25,377 in 2020) received a follow up phone call to ensure it was not a hoax. The event was also inadvertently underbooked of talent, with one musical act persuaded to stay on from 2:30am until 6am when the next act would arrive. However the event raised more than anticipated, netting $104,829 ($1,330,125 in 2020) in donations. The first Telethon also featured an infamous segment where guests Stuart Wagstaff, Johnny O'Keefe, Bobby Limb and Graham Kennedy, who were shirtless at the time as part of a dare, had to scramble to find their clothing before then-Premier of Western Australia David Brand made an appearance at the station. Wagstaff would become closely associated with Telethon, with the entertainer returning for 35 subsequent Telethons, making his last appearance via video in 2009.

Michael Jackson appeared on the October 1985 Telethon as part of a deal with Western Australian millionaire Robert Holmes à Court (who owned the television station at the time) to acquire ATV Music Publishing. Jackson could not perform due to contractual reasons, but he spoke briefly and met the two "Little Telethon Stars".

2007 marked 40 years since Telethon began in Western Australia and raised more than $6.5 million. This was more than double the previous record amount of $3 million. Telethon 2008 raised a further $7.5 million, with the Australian Federal Government contributing $1.5 million, and a lottery winner donating $1 million of her winnings to the cause. The 2008 event also featured an Australian rules football match between former West Coast Eagles players and former Fremantle Dockers players in tribute to Chris Mainwaring, a former West Coast Eagles player and Seven News sports presenter who had died the previous year. The match continued to be held until 2012.

In 2010, Telethon broke its record set in 2008, raising $9,237,539. This figure was later revised to $10 million as the phones kept ringing after the Telethon finished. In addition, 2010 marked the year in which the total amount collected over the previous 43 years surpassed the $100 million milestone. This Telethon was touted by Seven Network owner Kerry Stokes as being "the best Telethon ever". In 2011, Telethon once again broke the previous record by raising $13,473,159. In 2012, Telethon broke several records, with the metropolitan Telethon Home selling for a record $1.2 million at the auction. In addition, the final total broke the $15 million milestone, raising a record $16,805,622. The telecast featured a live performance via video from Elton John who was performing at the gala opening of Perth Arena. In 2013, Telethon again broke the record, raising $20.7 million. The records continued to be broken in 2014, with a total of $25,271,542, due partly to a $20m five-year commitment by BHP.

In 2015, $25.8 million was raised by the event. That same year also saw Telethon Avenue, a street in the Kings Square precinct of the Perth City Link project, named in recognition of the organisation. The name was initially rejected by the Geographic Names Committee, with then-Premier Colin Barnett believing it was "inappropriate" to name a street after a commercial organisation; however the decision was reversed following lobbying by prominent local figures and the intervention of then-Foreign Minister Julie Bishop. The event in 2016 saw $26,290,154 as the final total, which took Telethon's total raised over 49 years to $231,886,120.

In Telethon's 50th year in 2017, it raised $10 million more than its previous record amount, amounting to a total of $36,431,381. In 2018, Telethon raised more than $38 million after a $2 million donation on behalf of Seven West Media at the last minute, which also saw the $300 million mark of total donations be broken.

In 2020, challenges and restrictions imposed by the COVID-19 pandemic saw several changes to the annual Telethon broadcast. Most notably, the event replaced its traditional 26-hour live marathon broadcast with two, 3-hour live primetime specials broadcast from the Crown Theatre at Crown Perth on the evenings of 24 and 25 October 2020. Due to ongoing border restrictions, the 2020 broadcast also focused more on WA-based performers and personalities, though celebrities from the eastern states and overseas, and those from Seven's shows still featured during the event via pre-recorded segments. 2020 also saw the first Telethon Family Festival held at Perth Stadium on 25 October 2020. The fundraising event was promoted as an opportunity for families to come together following the easing of pandemic restrictions and the cancellation of the 2020 Perth Royal Show earlier in the year. Despite the new, much shorter format, the challenges faced by the event, and the uncertain economic climate, Telethon set a new record of $46,331,097 raised in 2020.

For 2021, Telethon returned to its traditional 26-hour continuous broadcast format, with live broadcasts from the Crown Theatre and at the call centre at Crown Perth, and from the Telethon Family Festival at Perth Stadium; however, due to ongoing border restrictions, the event again showcased mainly WA-based entertainers and talent. Telethon 2021 set a new record of $62,115,467 raised, surpassing the $50 million mark in annual donations for the first time as well as the $400 million mark in total donations, with the State Government of Western Australia donating $10 million and the Federal Government of Australia contributing $5 million.

In 2022 Telethon was broadcast from Perth Arena for the first time. The venue and a section of Wellington Street also hosted the Telethon Family Festival. The 2022 event set a new record of $71,356,721 raised, and saw the milestone of $500 million in total donations passed.

Annual summaries

References

External links
7 Perth Telethon website
Donate to Telethon

Culture in Perth, Western Australia
Non-profit organisations based in Western Australia
Seven Network
Australian telethons
Charities based in Australia
Television shows set in Perth, Western Australia
Recurring events established in 1968
Events in Perth, Western Australia
1968 establishments in Australia